Nimmada is a village and panchayat in Kotabommali Mandal, Srikakulam District, Andhra Pradesh, India. It comes under Tekkali assembly constituency.

Geography

Demographics
According to Indian census, 2001, the demographic details of Nimmada village is as follows:
 Total population: 2,811 in 592 households
 Male population: 1,484 
 Female population: 1,327
 Children under 6-years of age: 316 (moys - 161 and girls - 155)
 Total literates: 	1,383

Politics

It is one of the prominent villages in Kotabommali Mandal as it is the hometown of three important political leaders.
1. Krishna Murthy Kinjarapu - He became the MLA for Harishchandrapuram assembly constituency in 1964.
2. Yerrannaidu Kinjarapu - He was the MLA for Harishchandrapuram assembly constituency from 1982 to 1996, then he went on to become the Member of Parliament, Srikakulam District(1996–2009).
3. Atchanna Naidu Kinjarapu - Elected MLA for Harishchandrapuram assembly constituency since 1996 to 2009.And MLA for Tekkali Assembly constituency. He is the younger brother of Yerrannaidu Kinjarapu

Education
There are three Mandal Parishad (M.P.) primary schools and one Zilla Parishad (Z.P.) high school. M.P.Primary School, Z.P.High School.

References

Villages in Srikakulam district